The NAIA Women's Outdoor Track and Field Championship is the annual track meet to determine the national champions of NAIA women's outdoor track and field in the United States and Canada. It has been held annually since 1981.

The most successful program has been Prairie View A&M, with 9 NAIA national titles (PVAMU has subsequently joined the NCAA).

The current champions are British Columbia, who won their second national title in 2021.

Results

Champions

 Schools highlighted in pink are closed or no longer sponsor athletics.
 Schools highlight in yellow have reclassified athletics from the NAIA.

See also
NAIA Track and Field
NAIA Women's Indoor Track and Field Championship
NAIA Men's Indoor Track and Field Championship
NAIA Men's Outdoor Track and Field Championship
NCAA Track and Field
NCAA Women's Outdoor Track and Field Championships (Division I, Division II, Division III)
NCAA Women's Indoor Track and Field Championships (Division I, Division II, Division III)
NCAA Men's Outdoor Track and Field Championships (Division I, Division II, Division III)
NCAA Men's Indoor Track and Field Championships (Division I, Division II, Division III)

References

External links
NAIA Women's Outdoor Track and Field

Track
College track and field competitions in the United States
Women's sports in the United States